The 1968 Minnesota Golden Gophers football team represented the University of Minnesota in the 1968 Big Ten Conference football season. In their 15th year under head coach Murray Warmath, the Golden Gophers compiled a 6–4 record and outscored their opponents by a combined total of 207 to 190.
 
Linebacker Wayne King received the team's Most Valuable Player award. End Bob Stein was named an All-American by the Walter Camp Football Foundation, Associated Press, United Press International and Football Writers Association of America. Stein, guard Dick Enderle and guard Noel Jenke were named All-Big Ten first team. Tackle Ezell Jones, defensive tackle Ron Kamzelski, tight end Ray Parson and safety Doug Roalstad were named All-Big Ten second team. Stein was named an Academic All-American. Stein, linebacker Noel Jenke, linebacker Wayne King and halfback Barry Mayer were named Academic All-Big Ten.

Total attendance at six home games was 312,806, an average of 52,134 per game. The largest crowd was against USC.

Schedule

Roster

Game summaries

Michigan

On October 26, 1968, Minnesota lost to Michigan by a 33 to 20 score before a homecoming crowd of 69,384.  The game was the 59th meeting in the Little Brown Jug rivalry. Michigan lost the 1967 game by a 20–15 score.

For Michigan, Dennis Brown completed 11 of 20 passes for 152 yards and two touchdowns, and Ron Johnson carried the ball 33 times for 84 yards and two touchdowns. Michigan led 30–0 at halftime and 33–0 at the start of the fourth quarter, but Minnesota mounted a comeback with 20 points in the fourth quarter with Michigan's reserves in the game. Michigan gained 252 rushing yards and 201 passing yards in the game.  Minnesota gained 149 rushing yards and 200 passing yards.

References

Minnesota
Minnesota Golden Gophers football seasons
Minnesota Golden Gophers football